Nicolas "Nico" Jean Prost (born 18 August 1981) is a French professional racing driver. He most recently raced in the FIA Formula E Championship before quitting the series. Also, he was a longstanding racer in the FIA World Endurance Championship for Lotus Rebellion Racing. Furthermore, He competes in the Andros Trophy and he was a reserve driver for the now defunct Lotus F1 team. He is a son of four-time Formula One world champion Alain Prost.

Career

Early years
Born in Saint-Chamond, Loire, and despite being the oldest son of four-time Formula One World Drivers' champion Alain Prost and his wife Anne-Marie, he started his career at the late age of 22 in Formula Campus. He was born 2 days after his father had competed in the 1981 Austrian Grand Prix. Like his father, Prost was a golfer, winning tournaments when he was at Columbia University in New York.

Formula Three
In 2006, he joined Racing Engineering to contest in the Spanish Formula Three Championship. He won one race and had six podiums, which earned him 4th place in the championship as well as the best rookie title.

In 2007, he finished third in the Spanish Formula Three Championship with 2 wins, 1 pole and 7 podiums.

Euro Formula 3000
In 2008, he joined Bull racing and won the Euroseries 3000 championship in his first year with one win, two poles and seven podiums.

A1 Grand Prix
For A1 GP season 3 (2007–2008), Nicolas was the rookie driver for Team France.

For A1 GP season 4 (2008–2009), Nicolas was still the rookie driver and topped every single rookie sessions. He was promoted to racing driver for the end of the season and showed that he had the pace to fight on top. The team issued in a statement at the end of the seasons that he should be driving the entire 2009–2010 season.

Sports car racing

24 Hours of Le Mans
In 2007, he competed with Team Oreca in a Saleen S7-R with Laurent Groppi and Jean-Philippe Belloc and finished 5th in his category.

In 2009, he raced for the first time in the LMP1 category, with Speedy Racing Team Sebah. He drove a great race, especially on Sunday morning with a stunning quadruple stint which moved the car from 8th to 5th. Unfortunately, a gearbox problem later dropped the car to 14th.

After a difficult year in 2010, where he nonetheless drove the fastest lap of rebellion cars, he had a great race in 2011. Prost and his teammates Jani and Bleekemolen finished 6th and 1st in the unofficial petrol class.

In the 80th edition of the 24 Hours of Le Mans in 2012, Prost and the Rebellion Racing Team got the fourth place in the LM-P1 class along with his co-drivers Neel Jani and Nick Heidfeld, their Lola B12/60 Coupe Toyota covered a total of 367 laps (3,108.123 miles), in the Circuit de la Sarthe. Prost drove the last stage of the competition.

Le Mans Series
In 2009, he participated in the European Le Mans Series for Speedy Racing Team Sebah alongside Marcel Fässler and Andrea Belicchi. The trio finished 5th in the championship.
Since 2010 he is racing in the European Le Mans Series for Rebellion Racing alongside Swiss racing driver Neel Jani.

FIA World Endurance Championship

In 2012 and 2013, Prost competed in the FIA World Endurance Championship with Rebellion Racing in a LMP1-class Lola B12/60 Toyota. With his mate Neel Jani, they won 9 races in these two years in the LMP1 privateer category. He will race the new Rebellion R-One in the 2014 FIA World Endurance Championship season. Prost has won the first four races of 2014 in the LMP1-L Category and has already clinched the title in the category.

American Le Mans Series
Prost clinched back to back victories at Petit Le Mans in 2012 and 2013. He also finished 3rd in the Sebring 12 Hours in 2013.

Andros Trophy
During the 2009–2010 winter, Prost participated to the famous Andros Trophy ice racing series in the electrical car category. He clinched the championship with 5 poles, 6 wins, and 18 podiums out of 21 races. He successfully defended his title during the 2010–2011 winter.

In 2011–2012, he joined his dad in the works Dacia team and claimed the rookie title in the main series.

Formula One

In 2010, he drove a Renault F1 for the first time in Magny-Cours and impressed the team, beating his daily opponent by more than 2 seconds.

In 2011, he joined the gravity management structure and remained a driver for Lotus Renault F1. He drove some test sessions and straight line tests for the team, as well as some commercial roadshows.

In 2012, he remained a part of the Lotus Renault program and on 4 October 2012 it was announced that he would be testing with Lotus Renault Formula One during the young driver test at Abu Dhabi.

In 2013, he was still test and development driver for Lotus. He drove the rookie test in Silverstone where he posted the absolute fastest lap among the rookies and was only three tenths behind Vettel in the Red Bull.

In 2014, he remained test and development driver for Lotus.

Formula E

On 30 June 2014, Prost signed up for the inaugural FIA Formula E Championship with the team e.dams Renault. At the first race in Beijing, Prost became the first man to achieve a pole position in Formula E. He led the race until the last lap in the last corner where he was involved in a heavy crash with Nick Heidfeld. Prost turned into Heidfeld's car when he was being challenged into the last corner, lunging Heidfeld's car into a barrier. He later apologised for the incident. He was subsequently given a ten place grid penalty for the following race in Malaysia. In the second race in Putrajaya, Malaysia, he took pole position again but was given a ten place grid penalty carried from the previous race. He took his first win in Miami, despite a late challenge from Scott Speed. The result was enough for Prost to take the lead in the drivers' championship from Lucas di Grassi.

Racing record

Career summary

† As Prost was a guest driver, he was ineligible for championship points.

24 Hours of Le Mans results

Le Mans Series results

Intercontinental Le Mans Cup results

Complete FIA World Endurance Championship results

Complete Formula E results
(key) (Races in bold indicate pole position; races in italics indicate fastest lap)

† Driver did not finish the race, but was classified as he completed over 90% of the race distance.

References

External links
 
 

1981 births
Living people
People from Saint-Chamond
French people of Armenian descent
French racing drivers
Euroformula Open Championship drivers
German Formula Renault 2.0 drivers
French Formula Renault 2.0 drivers
Formula Renault Eurocup drivers
A1 Team France drivers
24 Hours of Le Mans drivers
European Le Mans Series drivers
World Series Formula V8 3.5 drivers
American Le Mans Series drivers
FIA GT1 World Championship drivers
FIA World Endurance Championship drivers
Formula E drivers
Stock Car Brasil drivers
Sportspeople from Loire (department)
A1 Grand Prix drivers
Graff Racing drivers
DAMS drivers
Racing Engineering drivers
Rebellion Racing drivers
Oreca drivers
Campos Racing drivers